Three submarines of the United States Navy have been named USS Tang, after the tang, or surgeonfish, especially of the several West Indian species.  May refer to:
 , a  sunk by her own torpedo during World War II
 , the lead boat of her class, served through the first half of the Cold War
 , a planned 

United States Navy ship names